Taminan (also Romanized as Ţamīnān and Tamīnān; also known as Eţmīnān and Ţambītān) is a village in Lay Siyah Rural District, in the Central District of Nain County, Isfahan Province, Iran. At the 2006 census, its population was 100, in 28 families.

References 

Populated places in Nain County